Whiskey Dick is an unincorporated locale in Wasco County, Oregon, United States.

References 

Unincorporated communities in Wasco County, Oregon
Unincorporated communities in Oregon